Jesse Anson Canniff (April 30, 1900 – November 16, 1966) was an American farmer, businessman, and politician.

Biography 
Born on a farm near Juneau, Wisconsin, Canniff attended high school and Beaver Dam Business College in Beaver Dam, Wisconsin. Canniff was a farmer until 1926. He then served as president of Canniff Oil, Inc. He also served as chairman of the American National Bank and as director of the Wayland Academy. Caniff lived in Beaver Dam, Wisconsin and served on the Beaver Dam Common Council from 1936 to 1942. From 1943 to 1949, Canniff served in the Wisconsin State Assembly as a Republican. Canniff died in a hospital in Beaver Dam, Wisconsin after suffering a stroke.

References

1900 births
1966 deaths
Politicians from Beaver Dam, Wisconsin
Businesspeople from Wisconsin
Farmers from Wisconsin
Wisconsin city council members
Republican Party members of the Wisconsin State Assembly
People from Juneau, Wisconsin
20th-century American politicians
20th-century American businesspeople